Sea Prayer is an illustrated novel by Afghan-American author Khaled Hosseini inspired by the Syrian refugee crisis and the death of Alan Kurdi. It was first created as 
a virtual reality experience in 2017, and was published as a book in 2018, illustrated in watercolor by Dan Williams.

Plot 

The book is written in the form of a letter from father to son; the two have fled their home in Homs, Syria due to the Syrian Civil War, and face the dangerous Mediterranean crossing.

Reviews
Kirkus Reviews called Sea Prayer "Intensely moving" and "Powerfully evocative of the plight in which displaced populations find themselves." Publishers Weekly wrote that it "does not dwell on nightmarish fates; instead, its emotional power flows from the love of a father for his son."

References 

2018 American novels
Novels set in Syria
Works about the Syrian civil war
Bloomsbury Publishing books
Novels by Khaled Hosseini
Books about ISIS
Riverhead Books books
2018 Afghan novels